Zalissa catocalina is a moth of the family Noctuidae first described by Francis Walker in 1865. It is found in Papua New Guinea and Australia. In Australia, it is found in or near rainforests in eastern Australia as far south as northern New South Wales.

Adults are brown and yellow, with a unique colour pattern on the underside of the forewing.

The larvae feed on grape vines.

Gallery

References

Moths of Australia
Agaristinae
Moths described in 1865
Moths of Papua New Guinea